Ousmane Diarra (born 10 February 1964) is a retired athlete who represented Senegal and later France. He was initially a 400 metres sprinter competing at the 1988 Summer Olympics but later switched to the 800 metres. On that distance he won the bronze medal at the 1994 European Indoor Championships and the silver at the 1994 Jeux de la Francophonie.

He became French indoor champion in 1997.

Competition record

Personal bests
Outdoor
400 metres – 46.23 (Seoul 1998)
800 metres – 1:45.45 (Caorle 1990)
Indoor: 1:47.18 (Paris 1994)
1000 metres – 2:19.66 (Villeneuve-d'Ascq 1993)

References

1964 births
Living people
Senegalese male sprinters
Senegalese male middle-distance runners
French male sprinters
French male middle-distance runners
Athletes (track and field) at the 1988 Summer Olympics
Olympic athletes of Senegal
Senegalese emigrants to France